Chris Nelson (born August 18, 1964) is an American politician serving as a member of the South Dakota Public Utilities Commission. Nelson had previously served as Secretary of State of South Dakota from 2003 to 2011. A Republican, he was a candidate to become U.S. Representative from South Dakota's At-large congressional district in 2010, but lost to Kristi Noem in the Republican primary.

Career
As secretary of state, Nelson received the 2010 Excellent Service to South Dakota County Officials award from the South Dakota County Officials Association; the 2004 Hazeltine/Taylor award from South Dakota Kids Voting; and the 2003 Excellence in South Dakota Municipal Government award from the South Dakota Municipal League. In 2005, he was appointed as a National Governors Association representative on the United States Election Assistance Commission Board of Advisors.

U.S. Senate consideration
Nelson was mentioned as a possible successor to Democratic U.S. Senator Tim Johnson, who suffered stroke-like bleeding in the brain caused by a congenital malformation known as arteriovenous malformation. Instead, former Governor Mike Rounds was elected.

References

External links
Chris Nelson at Ballotpedia
Office website

|-

1964 births
Living people
Place of birth missing (living people)
Secretaries of State of South Dakota
South Dakota Republicans
South Dakota State University alumni